Sarah Kinsley (born 2001) is an American singer-songwriter. Throughout her childhood, she performed classical music in youth orchestras and eventually studied music theory at Columbia University, where she began to produce her own alt pop music. She has continually expressed the importance of her producing every aspect of her music due to the underrepresentation of female producers in the music industry. After her song "The King" had success on TikTok in 2021, she released an extended play (EP) of the same name, which was listed on NMEs list of top debut projects of 2021. Kinsley followed up the project with another EP, Cypress (2022).

Life and career
Kinsley was born in 2001 in Mountain View, California, where she lived for the first five months of her life. She grew up in a small town in Connecticut and is of Chinese-American descent. On the presence of music in her early life, Kinsley said: "it was just everything. It was always there. I think that was part of the reason why I had to do music, in some form. At some point, it just became inseparable from life." Whilst growing up, Kinsley trained in classical piano and violin and performed in youth orchestras. She "made a name for herself" due to her emotional nature whilst performing. Whilst attending middle school, Kinsley and her family moved to Singapore, where she attended an international school. Kinsley has cited her classical training as an important factor for her song production process. As a teenager, she began a journey into pop music, posting song covers of artists including Justin Bieber and Julia Michaels to Instagram. Kinsley was initially shy about her singing voice but found validation from the positive response to her videos.

Kinsley eventually moved to New York City. Years after she had attended the school in Singapore, she was contacted by former classmate Luc Bradford, who had become a music producer under the name Ford. He had seen her music covers online and reached out to make a song with Kinsley, and the pair released the song "Craving". She wrote the lyrics and Ford produced it, and after releasing it, Kinsley said that although it gave her good contacts in the music industry, she received "twisted" compliments since she was just a feature on the song, with no input into the production. It then inspired her to learn music production. After she learned of a 2018 report by the University of Southern California that found 2% of producers identify as female, Kinsley wanted to challenge the statistic through producing all of her own music. Kinsley studied music theory at Columbia University, and as part of her assignments, she was expected to produce and record songs, which she also released publicly. She revealed that after she submitted her 2021 single "Over + Under" for an assignment, she received a good grade in that class. Additionally, she was a member of Nonsequitur A Cappella. While studying at Columbia, Kinsley often experienced male classmates speaking over her and found it to be a male-geared environment. She explained that the music industry needs to "recognise and amplify female producers" such as herself.

On June 4, 2021, Kinsley released the extended play (EP) The King, the title track of which went viral on TikTok. NMEs Sophie Williams praised the EP; she found Kinsley's vocals and storytelling to be the highlights. Despite finding it to be a short EP at 20-minutes long, Williams opined that Kinsley had "meticulously crafted" the project. Williams later listed The King in NMEs list of top debut projects of 2021, and Kinsley herself was listed in the publication's list of top 100 2022 emerging artists. In April 2022, Kinsley released the lead single from her third EP, "Hills of Fire". Speaking about the song to DIY magazine, she said that she wrote the song after The King had begun performing well commercially. Herself and her family went to California, where she was born, to escape from "the noise" of the press interviews, media and people's opinions. It was there that she formed the idea for her next EP to be bodied around "unravelling, the growth of uncertainty, the unknowing", and she felt that "Hills of Fire" embodied that. Then in May 2022, she released the second single, "What Was Mine". She subsequently announced that the EP will be titled Cypress; the EP title was inspired by cypress trees that she kept seeing and looking out for whilst visiting California. It was released on June 10, 2022, and she supported its release with a North American tour.

Artistry
Kinsley is mainly an alt pop singer. Kinsley has been inspired by classical music throughout her music as a result of studying it in her youth, specifically naming Chopin, Clara Schumann, Beethoven, Debussy and Ravel. She has cited New Zealand singer Lorde as a heavy inspiration for music, specifically noting the effect that her 2017 album Melodrama had on her music. She explained that she wants to create "juicy, sweet, daring, open, intimate, full songs that have no bounds" in the way that Lorde did on Melodrama. Fleetwood Mac, ABBA, Sting, the Eagles, Foreigner and Madonna have also been an inspiration for her.

Discography

Extended plays

Singles

References

External links
 

2001 births
21st-century American women singers
21st-century American singers
American emigrants to Singapore
American musicians of Chinese descent
American singers of Asian descent
American women singer-songwriters
Living people
People from Mountain View, California
Singer-songwriters from Connecticut
Singer-songwriters from New York (state)